Arthur Campbell may refer to:

People
Arthur Campbell (Clan Arthur), Scotsman rewarded for his support of Robert the Bruce
Arthur Campbell (Virginia soldier) (1743–1811), member of the Virginia House of Burgesses, for whom Campbell County, Tennessee is named
Vin Campbell (Arthur Vincent Campbell, 1888–1969), Major League Baseball player
Arthur Grant Campbell (born 1916), Canadian diplomat
Arthur Campbell (chemist) (born 1925), New Zealand chemist

Fictional characters
Arthur Campbell (Last Exile), a character in the anime series Last Exile